Pekka Virta (born April 19, 1969) is a Finnish former professional ice hockey player and current head coach of SaiPa in the Finnish Liiga.

Virta played with six seasons in the SM-liiga, registering 51 goals, 42 assists, 93 points, and 272 penalty minutes, while playing 212 games with four teams between 1991–92 and  1997–98.

References

External links
 

1969 births
Living people
Finnish ice hockey forwards
Ässät players
Lukko players
Nottingham Panthers players
HC TPS players
TuTo players
Ässät coaches
Sportspeople from Turku